Nasva may refer to:
Nasva, Hiiu County, a village in Hiiu County, Estonia
Nasva, Saare County, a small borough in Saare County, Estonia
Nasva, Russia, a rural locality (a village) in Novosokolnichesky District of Pskov Oblast, Russia
Nasva (stream), a stream in Saare County, Estonia
NASVA: National agency for Automotive Safety & Victims´Aid a Japanese program for car safety (see :es:Nasva)